Joan Theresa Burke (8 February 1928 – 27 November 2016) was an Irish Fine Gael politician, farmer and nurse who served as a Teachta Dála (TD) from 1964 to 1981. 

She was first elected to Dáil Éireann as a Fine Gael TD for the Roscommon constituency at the July 1964 by-election caused by the death of her husband James Burke. Her victory made her the first woman to ever represent County Roscommon as a TD, and she was only the fourth woman to represent Cumann na nGaedheal/Fine Gael since the foundation of the state. Burke topped the poll in every single election she ever fought.

Although sometimes erroneously cited as a native of Tulsk, she was, in fact, a native of Bandon, County Cork. She first came to Tulsk to attend a friend's wedding and while there met James Burke, whom she later married in 1959. At the time of the marriage, James had already been a TD for 5 years. It was in James' native Tulsk the pair settled.

As a TD, Joan Burke was a pronounced opponent of the “marriage bar” which prohibited women in Ireland from working in the public sector if they were married (the mentality of the time being that a married woman's place was in the home). She was also a noted advocate for the rights of farmers.

She retired from politics at the 1981 general election.

See also
Families in the Oireachtas

References

1928 births
2016 deaths
Fine Gael TDs
20th-century Irish farmers
Members of the 17th Dáil
Members of the 18th Dáil
Members of the 19th Dáil
Members of the 20th Dáil
Members of the 21st Dáil
Politicians from County Roscommon
Spouses of Irish politicians
20th-century women Teachtaí Dála
People from Bandon, County Cork
21st-century Irish farmers